Susan Muwonge (born in 1977) is a Ugandan rally driver and teacher. Called 'Super Lady' and "Queen of Speed", in 2011 after becoming the first female to win the Uganda's national rally championships.

Education 
She was born to her father Kitonsa Fred and her late mother was Namukasa Regina and she went to St Mary's Primary School Nabbingo for her Primary school (PLE), completed her Uganda Certificate of Education (UCE) from St Henry's Buyege Girls’ Secondary School and her Uganda Advanced Certificate of Education (UACE) from Gombe Secondary School. She attended Makerere University graduating with a  BBA and then she joined Kyambogo University and attained a Bachelor's in Early Childhood Education.

Career 
Very soon after graduating, she and her husband Lawrence Muwonge started St Francis Junior School in Buddo Wakiso District. She bought her first racing car, Mitsubishi Evo 2 formerly driven by Jamil Ssenyonjo and started rallying in 2005. In her first race in Rakai, she finished in the 6th position. Her racing career officially began in 2007 at Garuga Racing Track. She became the first woman to win the National Rally Championship (NRC) in November 2011, beating Ponsiano Lwakataka in the 300 km Independence rally at the Festino City Race Circuit. When not rallying and teaching, Muwonge enjoys farming, acting and singing.

Awards 

 Uganda Sports Press Association (USPA) accolade (October 2011) 
 USPA Sports Personality of the Year (January 2012)

References 

1977 births
Living people
Rally drivers
Ugandan sportswomen
Makerere University alumni
Kyambogo University alumni